In geometry, an equidissection is a partition of a polygon into triangles of equal area.  The study of equidissections began in the late 1960s with Monsky's theorem, which states that a square cannot be equidissected into an odd number of triangles. In fact, most polygons cannot be equidissected at all.

Much of the literature is aimed at generalizing Monsky's theorem to broader classes of polygons. The general question is: Which polygons can be equidissected into how many pieces? Particular attention has been given to trapezoids, kites, regular polygons, centrally symmetric polygons, polyominos, and hypercubes.

Equidissections do not have many direct applications. They are considered interesting because the results are counterintuitive at first, and for a geometry problem with such a simple definition, the theory requires some surprisingly sophisticated algebraic tools. Many of the results rely upon extending p-adic valuations to the real numbers and extending Sperner's lemma to more general colored graphs.

Overview

Definitions
A dissection of a polygon P is a finite set of triangles that do not overlap and whose union is all of P. A dissection into n triangles is called an n-dissection, and it is classified as an even dissection or an odd dissection according to whether n is even or odd.

An equidissection is a dissection in which every triangle has the same area. For a polygon P, the set of all n for which an n-equidissection of P exists is called the spectrum of P and denoted S(P). A general theoretical goal is to compute the spectrum of a given polygon.

A dissection is called simplicial if the triangles meet only along common edges. Some authors restrict their attention to simplicial dissections, especially in the secondary literature, since they are easier to work with. For example, the usual statement of Sperner's lemma applies only to simplicial dissections. Often simplicial dissections are called triangulations, although the vertices of the triangles are not restricted to the vertices or edges of the polygon. Simplicial equidissections are therefore also called equal-area triangulations.

The terms can be extended to higher-dimensional polytopes: an equidissection is set of simplexes having the same n-volume.

Preliminaries
It is easy to find an n-equidissection of a triangle for all n. As a result, if a polygon has an m-equidissection, then it also has an mn-equidissection for all n. In fact, often a polygon's spectrum consists precisely of the multiples of some number m; in this case, both the spectrum and the polygon are called principal and the spectrum is denoted . A simple example of a non-principal polygon is the quadrilateral with vertices (0, 0), (1, 0), (0, 1), (3/2, 3/2); its spectrum includes 2 and 3 but not 1.

Affine transformations of the plane are useful for studying equidissections, including translations, uniform and non-uniform scaling, reflections, rotations, shears, and other similarities and linear maps. Since an affine transformation preserves straight lines and ratios of areas, it sends equidissections to equidissections. This means that one is free to apply any affine transformation to a polygon that might give it a more manageable form. For example, it is common to choose coordinates such that three of the vertices of a polygon are (0, 1), (0, 0), and (1, 0).

The fact that affine transformations preserve equidissections also means that certain results can be easily generalized. All results stated for a regular polygon also hold for affine-regular polygons; in particular, results concerning the unit square also apply to other parallelograms, including rectangles and rhombuses. All results stated for polygons with integer coordinates also apply to polygons with rational coordinates, or polygons whose vertices fall on any other lattice.

Best results
More generally, it is known that centrally symmetric polygons and polyominos have no odd equidissections. A conjecture by Sherman K. Stein proposes that no special polygon has an odd equidissection, where a special polygon is one whose equivalence classes of parallel edges each sum to the zero vector. Squares, centrally symmetric polygons, polyominos, and polyhexes are all special polygons.

The latter follows mutatis mutandis from the proof for the octahedron in 

Let T(a) be a trapezoid where a is the ratio of parallel side lengths. If a is a rational number, then T(a) is principal. In fact, if r/s is a fraction in lowest terms, then . More generally, all convex polygons with rational coordinates can be equidissected, although not all of them are principal; see the above example of a kite with a vertex at (3/2, 3/2).

At the other extreme, if a is a transcendental number, then T(a) has no equidissection. More generally, no polygon whose vertex coordinates are algebraically independent has an equidissection. This means that almost all polygons with more than three sides cannot be equidissected. Although most polygons cannot be cut into equal-area triangles, all polygons can be cut into equal-area quadrilaterals.

If a is an algebraic irrational number, then T(a) is a trickier case. If a is algebraic of degree 2 or 3 (quadratic or cubic), and its conjugates all have positive real parts, then S(T(a)) contains all sufficiently large n such that n/(1 + a) is an algebraic integer. It is conjectured that a similar condition involving stable polynomials may determine whether or not the spectrum is empty for algebraic numbers a of all degrees.

History
The idea of an equidissection seems like the kind of elementary geometric concept that should be quite old.  remark of Monsky's theorem, "one could have guessed that surely the answer must have been known for a long time (if not to the Greeks)." But the study of equidissections did not begin until 1965, when Fred Richman was preparing a master's degree exam at New Mexico State University.

Monsky's theorem
Richman wanted to include a question on geometry in the exam, and he noticed that it was difficult to find (what is now called) an odd equidissection of a square. Richman proved to himself that it was impossible for 3 or 5, that the existence of an n-equidissection implies the existence of an -dissection, and that certain quadrilaterals arbitrarily close to being squares have odd equidissections. However, he did not solve the general problem of odd equidissections of squares, and he left it off the exam. Richman's friend John Thomas became interested in the problem; in his recollection,

"Everyone to whom the problem was put (myself included) said something like 'that is not my area but the question surely must have been considered and the answer is probably well known.' Some thought they had seen it, but could not remember where. I was interested because it reminded me of Sperner's Lemma in topology, which has a clever odd-even proof."

Thomas proved that an odd equidissection was impossible if the coordinates of the vertices are rational numbers with odd denominators. He submitted this proof to Mathematics Magazine, but it was put on hold:

"The referee's reaction was predictable. He thought the problem might be fairly easy (although he could not solve it) and was possibly well-known (although he could find no reference to it)."

The question was instead given as an Advanced Problem in the American Mathematical Monthly . When nobody else submitted a solution, the proof was published in Mathematics Magazine , three years after it was written.  then built on Thomas' argument to prove that there are no odd equidissections of a square, without any rationality assumptions.

Monsky's proof relies on two pillars: a combinatorial result that generalizes Sperner's lemma and an algebraic result, the existence of a 2-adic valuation on the real numbers. A clever coloring of the plane then implies that in all dissections of the square, at least one triangle has an area with what amounts to an even denominator, and therefore all equidissections must be even.

Generalizations

Generalization to regular polygons arrived in 1985, during a geometry seminar run by G. D. Chakerian at UC Davis. Elaine Kasimatis, a graduate student, "was looking for some algebraic topic she could slip into" the seminar. Sherman Stein suggested dissections of the square and the cube: "a topic that Chakerian grudgingly admitted was geometric." After her talk, Stein asked about regular pentagons. Her proof builds on Monsky's proof, extending the p-adic valuation to the complex numbers for each prime divisor of n and applying some elementary results from the theory of cyclotomic fields. It is also the first proof to explicitly use an affine transformation to set up a convenient coordinate system.  then framed the problem of finding the spectrum of a general polygon, introducing the terms spectrum and principal. They proved that almost all polygons lack equidissections, and that not all polygons are principal.

 began the study of the spectra of two particular generalizations of squares: trapezoids and kites. Several papers have been authored at Hebei Normal University, chiefly by Professor Ding Ren and his students Du Yatao and Su Zhanjun.

Attempting to generalize the results for regular n-gons for even n,  conjectured that no centrally symmetric polygon has an odd equidissection, and he proved the n = 6 and n = 8 cases. A decade later, Stein made what he describes as "a surprising breakthrough", conjecturing that no polyomino has an odd equidissection. The full conjecture was proved when  treated the even case.

The topic of equidissections has recently been popularized by treatments in The Mathematical Intelligencer , a volume of the Carus Mathematical Monographs , and the fourth edition of Proofs from THE BOOK .

Related problems
 consider a variation of the problem: Given a convex polygon K, how much of its area can be covered by n non-overlapping triangles of equal area inside K? The ratio of the area of the best possible coverage to the area of K is denoted tn(K). If K has an n-equidissection, then tn(K) = 1; otherwise it is less than 1. The authors show that for a quadrilateral K, tn(K) ≥ 4n/(4n + 1), with t2(K) = 8/9 if and only if K is affinely congruent to the trapezoid T(2/3). For a pentagon, t2(K) ≥ 2/3, t3(K) ≥ 3/4, and tn(K) ≥ 2n/(2n + 1) for n ≥ 5.

Günter M. Ziegler asked the converse problem in 2003: Given a dissection of the whole of a polygon into n triangles, how close can the triangle areas be to equal? In particular, what is the smallest possible difference between the areas of the smallest and largest triangles? Let the smallest difference be M(n) for a square and M(a, n) for the trapezoid T(a). Then M(n) is 0 for even n and greater than 0 for odd n.  gave the asymptotic upper bound M(n) = O(1/n2) (see Big O notation).  improves the bound to M(n) = O(1/n3) with a better dissection, and he proves that there exist values of a for which M(a, n) decreases arbitrarily quickly.  obtain a superpolynomial upper bound, derived from an explicit construction that uses the Thue–Morse sequence.

References

Bibliography
Secondary sources

Primary sources

 Reprinted as

External links

Sperner’s Lemma, Brouwer’s Fixed-Point Theorem, And The Subdivision Of Squares Into Triangles - Notes by Akhil Mathew
Über die Zerlegung eines Quadrats in Dreiecke gleicher Fläche - Notes by Moritz W. Schmitt (German language)
Tiling Polygons by Triangles of Equal Area - Notes by AlexGhitza
Dissecting trapezoids into triangles of equal area - MathOverflow

Discrete geometry
Affine geometry
Geometric dissection